Arado may refer to:
 Arado Flugzeugwerke, a German aircraft company
 Arwad, an ancient city in Syria